Tuioti Reagan Maui'a (born July 6, 1984) is a former American football fullback. He was drafted by the Miami Dolphins in the sixth round of the 2007 NFL Draft. He played college football at Hawaii.

Maui'a has also played for the Cincinnati Bengals and Arizona Cardinals.

Early years
Maui'a was born in American Samoa. He attended Tokay High School in Lodi, California, and was a four-year letterman in football and track and field athletics. In football, he was an All-League and an All-Area selection. Maui'a graduated from Tokay High School in 2002. At the University of Hawaii, Maui'a was originally a 351-pound defensive lineman. He was switched to fullback after Senior Adam Olis tore his ACL and played that position at 295 pounds. He subsequently dropped to 270 pounds before the NFL Draft.

Professional career

Miami Dolphins
Maui'a was drafted by the Miami Dolphins in 2007. He took over the starting job in training camp when he beat out Cory Schlesinger for the starting job.

In 2008, Maui'a lost a preseason competition with Boomer Grigsby for the team's starting fullback job and was released on August 30 during final cuts.

Cincinnati Bengals
On September 3, 2008, Maui'a was signed by the Cincinnati Bengals after the team's starting fullback, Jeremi Johnson, was placed on injured reserve. Maui'a played in two games for the Bengals before being waived on October 11 when the team signed placekicker Dave Rayner.

Maui'a was re-signed on October 22 when Rayner was released. However, he was placed on season-ending injured reserve just two days later.

Arizona Cardinals
Maui'a was signed by the Arizona Cardinals on August 5, 2009, after fullback Justin Green was placed on injured reserve. He was waived on September 4.

Maui'a was re-signed to a future contract on January 21, 2010, after spending the 2009 season out of football.

He was released September 2, 2011, and then re-signed on November 2. He was waived again on November 29. He was re-signed again on August 11, 2012, and waived again on August 25. He re-signed with the team on September 28.

Personal life
He is the distant cousin of Samson Satele, who was also drafted by the Dolphins in the 2007 NFL Draft. He lived in Stockton.

In 2010 he was awarded the matai title of Tuioti by his mother's village of Falelima, Savai'i, in Samoa.

References

External links
Arizona Cardinals bio

1984 births
Living people
American sportspeople of Samoan descent
People from Lodi, California
Players of American football from California
American football defensive tackles
American football fullbacks
Hawaii Rainbow Warriors football players
Miami Dolphins players
Cincinnati Bengals players
Arizona Cardinals players
San Jose SaberCats players
Players of American football from American Samoa